Jonathan Pointing is an English actor, writer and comedian. He is best known for his roles in  Plebs, Pls Like, Big Boys, and as Vlad the Vampire in the Virgin Games television commercials.

Personal life
In July 2021, Pointing revealed that he had got married.

Filmography

References

External links 
 
 

1990s births
Living people
21st-century English actors
English film actors
English stage actors
English television actors
Actors from London